Karimabad Qadim (also Romanized as Karīmābād Qadīm; also known as Karīmābād) is a village in Nurabad Rural District, in the Central District of Delfan County, Lorestan Province, Iran. At the 2006 census, its population was 41, in 8 families.

References 

Towns and villages in Delfan County